The 2006 CONCACAF Women's U-20 Championship was the 3rd edition of the CONCACAF Women's U-20 Championship, the biennial international youth football championship organised by CONCACAF for the women's under-20 national teams of the North, Central American and Caribbean region. The top three sides also earned qualification to the 2006 FIFA U-20 Women's World Championship. 

The tournament was held between 18 and 27 January 2006. It featured eight teams and was played at the Estadio Luis "Pirata" Fuente (Veracruz) and the Estadio Rafael Murillo Vidal (Córdoba) in Mexico. The tournament was won by the United States, who defeated Canada in the final by a score of 3–2. Mexico secured the final qualification spot by defeating Jamaica in the third-place match.

Squads

Group stage

Group A

Group B

Knockout stage

Semi-finals

3rd Place

Final

Winners

Goalscorers

Qualified teams for FIFA U-20 Women's World Championship

1 Bold indicates champions for that year. Italic indicates hosts for that year.

References

External links 
CONCACAF 2006 Women's Under-20 Tournament Recap
CONCACAF Under 20 Women's Qualifying Tournament 2005/06 at RSSSF

CONCACAF Women's U-20 Championship
2006 CONCACAF Women's U-20 Championship
International women's association football competitions hosted by Mexico
CON
2006 in youth association football